Garus (also Romanized as Garūs and Garrūs) is a village in Babuyi Rural District, Basht District, Basht County, Kohgiluyeh and Boyer-Ahmad Province, Iran. At the 2006 census, its population was 94, in 20 families.

References 

Populated places in Basht County